Bluffmaster! is a 2005 Indian Hindi-language crime comedy film directed by Rohan Sippy and produced by Ramesh Sippy. The film stars Abhishek Bachchan, Priyanka Chopra, Riteish Deshmukh, Sanjay Mishra, Boman Irani and Nana Patekar. It is an adaptation of the 2000 Argentine film Nine Queens. It follows a conman who gets dumped by his girlfriend and after realising he is suffering from a severe illness, decides to help a new apprentice before dying.

Bluffmaster was released on 16 December 2005, and received mixed reviews from critics. The film became a box office success, becoming a semi-hit, as well as being the 13th highest-grossing Bollywood film of 2005. as well as the highest grosser of December.

Plot 
Roy Kapoor (Abhishek Bachchan) is a conman, information that his girlfriend Simran 'Simi' Ahuja (Priyanka Chopra) is not privy to. On the day of their engagement, however, Roy's true character is exposed and Simi leaves him. Consequently, Roy starts drinking heavily.

Six months later, Roy meets Aditya 'Dittu' Srivastav (Riteish) and Jassi (Sanjay Mishra), amateur conmen who attempt to con him but are unable to do so. They set their sights on a doctor, Dr. Bhalerao (played by Boman Irani) instead. Roy helps Bhalerao after he is conned and Bhalerao feels greatly indebted to him.

One fateful day, Roy drinks too much and starts feeling dizzy. In the middle of the street, he falls unconscious and is saved by Dittu. Dittu begs Roy to teach him (Dittu) all he (Roy) knows about the art of conning. Roy reluctantly agrees and the two start their escapades, conning everyone from a family to a "gang" who possesses black money. Roy and Dittu decide to visit a club, where Roy starts feeling dizzy again. He again falls unconscious. Dittu then takes him to hospital. Roy learns (via a CAT scan done by Dr. Bhalerao) that he has a brain tumor and will die within three months.

Simi, meanwhile, is working as a restaurant manager and is again engaged to be married to a man whom she doesn't love. Roy tries to tell her that he has a brain tumor. She eventually believes him – after meeting with the doctor – and they rekindle their friendship.

It is then revealed that Dittu's father and many others have been duped of their life savings by a man called Chandru (Nana Patekar), the main reason that Dittu became a conman in the first place. Roy decides that, before he dies, he'll help Dittu con Chandru of his stolen wealth. However, while planning the ultimate fraud, Roy's cancer enters its final stages.

Simi is then kidnapped by Chandru and Roy goes to rescue her. Roy is afterwards pushed by Chandru from the terrace of a building, only to survive because he falls on a huge inflated square. Roy then goes for an MRI scan at the hospital, which is actually closed, to realise that he is well and that his cancer has been cured.

Roy goes home, only to find that everything that happened until then was staged, masterminded by Dittu, scripted by Chandru and planned by Simi. Almost everybody involved in the plan was duped by Roy and the plan was to get him out of his wrong ways. Roy never had cancer: he thought he did because the scans were fake and drugs were sometimes added to Roy's drinks to make him feel those were symptoms of cancer. Roy then decides to mend his ways and thus the film ends happily.

Cast 
 Abhishek Bachchan as Roy Kapoor
 Priyanka Chopra as Simran 'Simi' Ahuja
Riteish Deshmukh as Aditya 'Dittu' Srivastav / Arjun Bajaj
 Sanjay Mishra as Jassi 
 Nana Patekar as Chandrakant 'Chandru' Parekh / Shridhar
 Boman Irani as Dr. Vijay Bhalerao
 Tinnu Anand as Parimal Bajaj, Arjun's father
 Mahesh Thakur as I. L. Malhotra
 Supriya Pilgaonkar as Mrs. I. L. Malhotra
 Arash Labaf in a special appearance in song "Buro Buro"
 Carol Gracias in a special appearance

Soundtrack 

The soundtrack was released on 20 November 2005. The background score was composed by Sameeruddin. According to the Indian trade website Box Office India, it was the tenth-highest-selling soundtrack album of that year, with around 1.4 million units sold.

Track listing 

"Sabse Bada Rupaiyya" : Mehmood, Chetan, Saira Hussain, TrickBaby – 4:09
"Say Na Say Na" : Aneela Mirza, Robert Uhlmann, Arash – 3:16
"Tadbeer Se Bigdi Hui Taqdeer" (Destiny Mix) : Geeta Dutt – 3:26
"Right Here Right Now" : Abhishek Bachchan, Sunidhi Chauhan – 3:02
"9 Parts of Desire" : TrickBaby (Hussain, Ager) – 3:48
"The Gateway Theme" : Sameeruddin – 2:47
"Boro Boro" : Robert Uhlmann, Arash – 3:06
"Do Aur Do Paanch" : Sameeruddin – 4:29
"Indi-Yarn" : TrickBaby (Hussain, Ager) – 3:58
"Neela" : TrickBaby (Hussain, Ager) – 3:06
"Parde Ke Peechhe" : Jaideep Sahni, TrickBaby (Hussain, Ager) – 3:37
"Come Fishing" (Bluffmaster Theme) : Sameeruddin – 2:42
"Right Here Right Now" (Hip Hop Mix) : Abhishek Bachchan, Sunidhi Chauhan – 3:43

Release

Reception 
Bluffmaster received mixed reviews from critics.

BBC News gave the film 4 stars out of 5, appreciating the "cleverly-constructed" storyline, direction and performances by the supporting cast. Raja Sen from Rediff.com praised the film, noting the film's comedy, dialogue, tone and music as its major positives and calling it a feel-good style Matchstick Men (2003). However, film and trade analyst Taran Adarsh reacted negatively, giving the film 1.5 stars out of 5, praising several individualistic sequences, music, dialogue and cinematography but criticizing the romance track, and mainly the climax, which he called "The Sixth Sense" kind of an ending.

Box office 
According to Box Office India, lifetime collection of the film is Rs. 327 million, and was thus declared a semi-hit at the box-office.

Home video 
In August 2020, the film began streaming on Amazon Prime Video. It is also streaming on Netflix.

References

External links 
 

2005 films
Films about con artists
Films directed by Rohan Sippy
Films set in Mumbai
2000s Hindi-language films
Indian crime comedy films
Films scored by Vishal–Shekhar
UTV Motion Pictures films
Indian remakes of foreign films
Indian comedy thriller films